The FFB Open was a pro–am minor-ranking snooker tournament, which was part of the Players Tour Championship. The tournament was only held in the 2011/2012 and 2012/2013 seasons. The event was split in two parts, with the first part taking place at the World Snooker Academy in Sheffield, England and the second part at the Event Forum in Fürstenfeldbruck, Germany. Mark Selby was the last champion.

Winners

References

 
Players Tour Championship
Sports competitions in Sheffield
Fürstenfeldbruck (district)
Recurring sporting events established in 2011
Recurring events disestablished in 2012
2011 establishments in England
2011 establishments in Germany
2012 disestablishments in England
2012 disestablishments in Germany
Snooker minor-ranking tournaments
Snooker competitions in England
Snooker competitions in Germany
Sports competitions in Bavaria